The accession of Albania to NATO took place in 2009. Albania's relationship with the North Atlantic Treaty Organization (NATO) began in 1992 when it joined the North Atlantic Cooperation Council. In 1994, it entered NATO's Partnership for Peace, which began Albania's process of accession into the alliance. In 1999, the country received a Membership Action Plan (MAP). The country received an invitation to join at the 2008 Bucharest Summit and became a full member on April 1, 2009.

Albania was among the first Eastern European countries to join the Partnership for Peace programme. Albanian politicians considered admission to NATO a top priority. Since 1992 Albania has been extensively engaged with NATO and has maintained its position as a stability factor and a strong ally of United States and EU in the troubled and divided region of the Balkans. In addition to the political will, the overwhelming majority of 95% of the Albanian population supported NATO membership.

Negotiation progress

North Atlantic Cooperation Council

After the fall of the Soviet Union in 1991, NATO created the North Atlantic Cooperation Council (NACC) to strengthen institutional cooperation on the political and security issues between NATO members and former Warsaw Pact countries. Albania joined in 1992.

Partnership for Peace

Partnership for Peace (PfP) is a NATO program aimed at creating trust between NATO and other states in Europe and the former Soviet Union. Albania signed the Partnership for Peace agreement 23 February 1994.

It was on this same day, 23 February, that Albania first officially applied to join NATO.

Membership Action Plan

NATO Membership Action Plans (MAP) are designed to assist aspiring partner countries meet NATO standards and prepare for possible future membership. Aspiring nations must first participate in MAP before they join the alliance. The Membership Action Plan (MAP) will remain the vehicle to keep aspirants' progress under review.

Albania received a MAP in 1999.

Bucharest summit accession protocols

At the 2008 NATO Bucharest summit, NATO member states signed accession protocols for Albania and Croatia. A signing ceremony was held, and witnessed by the foreign ministers of the two countries. Individual NATO member states must ratify the protocols according to their national requirements and procedures. NATO hoped to have it completed by the next NATO summit in April 2009.

Kuçovë Air Base

In August 2018, Prime Minister of Albania, Edi Rama announced that NATO plans to build its first air base in the Western Balkans near the municipality of Kuçovë in south-central Albania. Also, officials are discussing with the US and the alliance on "modernizing Albanian air capacities". The first phase of the project, expected to commence by the end of 2018 will have an estimated cost of 50 million euros.

Pashaliman Naval Base 
On 26 May 2022, Prime Minister Rama publicly offered NATO a naval base as an "added value" to the alliance "in these dangerous times", referring to the ongoing Russian invasion of Ukraine, which the Albanian government has formally denounced. The Pashaliman naval base, located in Vlorë Bay 180 kilometers (110 miles) south of the capital Tirana, was built in the 1950s by the Soviet Union and had sheltered up to 12 submarines. In the years following the end of the Cold War, it was neglected and looted before being renovated by Turkey; it is currently used by some military ships patrolling the Adriatic and Ionian seas. Rama announced that a project was already planned to further rehabilitate the base. The Associated Press reported that the offer was also intended to highlight Albania's contributions to NATO despite its small size.

Representatives

See also
Croatia–NATO relations
Foreign relations of Albania
Accession of Albania to the European Union

References

NATO relations
NATO
Treaties of Albania